Djemai Family is an Algerian TV series broadcast during the months of Ramadan 2008, 2009 and 2011. It is produced by SD-BOX, written by Osama Benhassine and Djaffar Gacem, dialogued by Mohamed Charchal.

The series tells the everyday life of an Algerian family with fresh and simple stories, dealing with originality the problems and challenges of contemporary Algerian society in a comic concept. It premiere on 2008 on Télévision Algérienne, A3 and Canal Algérie.

Cast  
 Salah Aougrout as Djemai
 Samira Sahraoui as Meriem
 Bouchra Okbi as Sarah
 Mohamed Bouchaïb as Rezki/Aristo
 Doudja Abdoun as Khoukha
 Farida Karim as Khalti Boualem
 Othmane Ben Daoud as Pedro
 Wissam Boualem as Wissam
 Azzeddine Bouchaïb as Samy
 Kawther El Bardi as Sakina
 Blaha Ben Ziane as Kadda
 Kamel Bouakkaz as Azzouz
 Mustapha Himoune as Lakhdar
 Hakim Zelloum as The inspector Fahem

References 

Algerian television series
Arabic television series
2008 Algerian television series debuts
Public Establishment of Television original programming